The Peck and Hills Furniture Company Warehouse is a historic warehouse located at 909 West Bliss Street on Goose Island in Chicago, Illinois. Built in 1901, the warehouse was the main storage and distribution facility for the Peck and Hills Furniture Company. Founded in 1896, the company became the largest furniture distributor in the country by the end of the 1920s. The company's warehouse facilities, which were expanded significantly during its growth, were integral to its ability to expand into new markets. The warehouse also connected to the city's railway network, allowing the company to easily ship its goods across the country. Peck and Hills declined significantly during the Great Depression, and it sold its Chicago warehouse facilities in 1942. The warehouse is now one of the few remnants of Goose Island's industrial history.

The warehouse was added to the National Register of Historic Places on May 18, 2015.

References

Industrial buildings and structures on the National Register of Historic Places in Chicago
Industrial buildings completed in 1901
Warehouses on the National Register of Historic Places